Duranbah is a town located in north-eastern New South Wales, Australia, in the Tweed Shire.

Demographics

The median age of the Duranbah population was 36 years, 1 year below the national median of 37.

85.2% of people living in Duranbah were born in Australia. The other top responses for country of birth were England 3.8%, New Zealand 2.3%, Scotland 1.1%, United States of America 1.1%, Indonesia 1.1%.

95% of people spoke only English at home.

References 

Suburbs of Tweed Heads, New South Wales